Don Dobri Airport  is an airstrip  southeast of Ensenada (es), a village on the eastern shore of Llanquihue Lake in the Los Lagos Region of Chile.

See also

Transport in Chile
List of airports in Chile

References

External links
OpenStreetMap - Don Dobri
OurAirports - Don Dobri
FallingRain - Don Dobri Airport

Airports in Los Lagos Region